Guttipelopia is a genus of non-biting midges in the subfamily Tanypodinae of the bloodworm family Chironomidae.

Species
G. currani Beck & Beck, 1966
G. guttipennis (Wulp, 1874)
G. rosenbergi Bilyj, 1984

References

Tanypodinae
Diptera of Europe